The Atari Coldfire Project (ACP) is a volunteer project that has created a modern Atari ST computer clone called the FireBee.

Reason for the project 

The Atari 16 and 32 computer systems (ST, TT and Falcon) were popular home computers in the 1980s and the first half of the 1990s. Atari withdrew largely from the computer market in 1993, and completely in 1995-1996 when Atari merged with JTS and all support for the platform by Atari was dropped. The systems Atari had built became increasingly left behind as newer and faster systems came out. The few dedicated users who were left wanted more processing power to develop more-advanced TOS applications, paving the way for a number of "clone" machines, such as the 68040-based Milan and the 68060-based Hades, both of which were considerably more powerful than the 68030-based TT and Falcon and the 68000-based ST/STe. These machines support ISA and PCI buses, which make the use of network and graphics cards designed for the PC possible (something no original Atari machines could do). The machines also support tower cases, making it possible to use internal CD drives.

A new clone named Phenix never made it to market in final form. However, the powerful rev. 6 68060 CPU it would use did make it into a new accelerator board for the Falcon, the CT60/CT63 series, which meant that, for the first time, the Atari platform had a CPU rated at over 100 MHz. The use of a high-speed bus and PC133 RAM also accounted for a big performance improvement and significantly increased the Falcon's on-board memory limit from 14 MiB to 512 MiB with a CT60.

These systems were not mass-produced and are now hard to find. While the CT60/CT63 needs a Falcon “donor” system, and is still not as powerful as the ACP potential system could be, the ACP will use a completely new design, moving away from 68K CPUs to the newer ColdFire class, more powerful than even the fastest 68K chips while still having a largely similar (but not completely compatible) instruction set. It will also allow for the integration of many I/O ports that are currently only available through extensive hardware modification on the Atari platform.

Specifications 

The specifications for the ACP have changed considerably over time, in response to advancing technology and price considerations. However, it seems the following will be in the final design according to former Atari Coldfire Project homepage:

Processor: Coldfire MCF5474, 264 MHz, 400 MIPS
RAM: DDR, 512 MB Main- + 128 MB Video- and Special-RAM on Board, Speed: 1 Gbit/s
Flash: 8 MB on Board for Operating Systems
Atari compatible interface ports:
 TT/Falcon-IDE,
 ST/TT-Floppy
 TT-SCSI (but faster)
 ACSI
 ROM-Port: 2×2 mm Connector
Printer Port, parallel
 ST/TT-serial
 Midi
 ST-Sound, YM2149 over AC'97
 ST/TT/Falcon-Video
 Atari-Keyboard with Mouse
Other Ports:
 Ethernet 10/100, 1 Port
 USB 2.0 Host (ISP1563), 5 Ports
 Compact-Flash, 1 Port
 SD-Card, 1 Port
 AC'97 Stereo Codec with DMA-Sound Output and  Sampling Input
 Sound_Connectors: LineIn, LineOut, Mic (Mono), DVD/CD internal
 New Video Modes about 2MegaPixel, true color
 PS2 Mouse/Keyboard Port
Battery Powered (if desired)
PCI 33 MHz direct Edge for passive backplane
Power controller with real time clock, PIC18F4520
Asynchrone  static RAM for DSP or similar already planned extensions in the future: Falcon DSP in the FPGA
Format: Card 
Power consumption of the complete board:

Operating systems 

On the 8MB ROM, FireBee devices have the following pre-installed software:
 BaS (BasicSystem)
 FPGA config
 FireTOS
 EmuTOS

There's a ready to use FreeMiNT and GUI environment setup with applications ported to work on ColdFire which can be ordered on CompactFlash card with the device.

µClinux has also been ported to FireBee.

Compatibility 

There are different strategies for dealing with the differences in ColdFire and 68K instruction set and opcodes:
 FireTOS includes 68K emulation based on an illegal instruction exception handler and CF68KLib
 68Kemu program (based on Musashi 68k emulator) can be used to run 68K programs with EmuTOS
 Most of the operating system and basic desktop software has been ported and built for ColdFire and rest is able to run with emulation
 Several commercial and shareware Atari SW packages have also either been ported to ColdFire or open sourced so that they could be ported to FireBee

FireBee FPGA doesn't yet provide DSP functionality which means that any Atari Falcon specific programs requiring DSP won't run.  Many Falcon games and demos use it to play background music.

Development tool support 

 GCC, VBCC and (Pure C compatible) AHCC C-compilers and their libraries have fully working ColdFire support
 Digger disassembler supports ColdFire
 RSC-editors like ResourceMaster work on Firebee
 GFA Basic has been modified to support FireTOS
 SDL library and its (Atari specific) LDG dependency are ported to ColdFire/FireBee

References

External links

former website
ACP FireBee on YouTube

Home computer remakes
Atari ST